Attorney General Porter may refer to:

Sir Andrew Porter, 1st Baronet (1837–1919), Attorney-General for Ireland
Christian Porter (born 1970), Attorney-General of Australia
Dana Porter (1901–1967), Attorney General of Ontario
William Porter (Attorney General) (1805–1880), Attorney-General of the Cape Colony

See also
General Porter (disambiguation)